We Looked in the Death's Face is a 1980 Soviet drama film directed by Naum Birman.

Plot 
The film takes place in March 1942. Lieutenant Obrant received the task of organizing a dance group. He found his former students and went with them to the Leningrad Front, where they held their first concert.

Cast 
 Oleg Dahl
 Lyubov Malinovskaya
 Larisa Tolkachyova
 Yuri Zhukov
 Boris Naumov
 Olga Kuznetsova		
 Yuliya Slezkinskaya
 Aleksandr Dovgalyov
 Aleksandr Zenkevich
 Igor Kustov

References

External links 
 

1980 films
1980s Russian-language films
Soviet war drama films
1980s war drama films